The 2015 Louisiana–Monroe Warhawks football team represented the University of Louisiana at Monroe in the 2015 NCAA Division I FBS football season. They began the season led by sixth-year head coach Todd Berry. Following a 59–21 loss to Arkansas State, Berry was fired after compiling a 28–43 record in six seasons as head coach. Defensive line coach John Mumford served as the interim head coach for the rest of the season. The Warhawks played their home games at Malone Stadium and competed in the Sun Belt Conference. They finished the season 2–11 overall and 1–7 in Sun Belt play to finish in last place,

Previous season
In 2014 the Warhawks finished the season 4–8, 3–5 in Sun Belt play to finish in a tie for seventh place.

Roster

Schedule

Source: Schedule

Game summaries

@ Georgia

In their first game of the season, the Warhawks lost, 51–14 to the Georgia Bulldogs. The game was delayed by 76 minutes due to lightning strikes during the third quarter. When a second lightning delay occurred with 9:54 remaining in the fourth quarter, the head coaches and athletic directors for both ULM and UGA mutually agreed to end the game at that point, citing safety concerns for both players and fans.

Nicholls State

In their second game of the season, the Warhawks won, 47–0 over the Nicholls State Colonels.

@ Alabama

In their third game of the season, the Warhawks lost, 34–0 to the Alabama Crimson Tide.

Georgia Southern

In their fourth game of the season, the Warhawks lost, 51–31 to the Georgia Southern Eagles. The game was played just hours after ULM backup quarterback Daniel Fitzwater was found dead.

@ Tulsa

In their fifth game of the season, the Warhawks lost, 34–24 to the Tulsa Golden Hurricane.

Appalachian State

In their sixth game of the season, the Warhawks lost, 59–14 to the Appalachian State Mountaineers.

@ Idaho

In their seventh game of the season, the Warhawks lost, 27–13 to the Idaho Vandals.

@ Louisiana–Lafayette

In their eighth game of the season, the Warhawks lost, 30–24 to the Louisiana–Lafayette Ragin' Cajuns.

@ Troy

In their ninth game of the season, the Warhawks lost, 51–14 to the Troy Trojans.

Arkansas State

In their tenth game of the season, the Warhawks lost, 59–21 to the Arkansas State Red Wolves. Head coach Todd Berry was fired following the game.

@ Texas State

In their eleventh game of the season, the Warhawks lost, 16–3 to the Texas State Bobcats.

@ Hawaii

In their twelfth game of the season, the Warhawks lost, 28–26 to the Hawaii Rainbow Warriors.

New Mexico State

In their thirteenth game of the season, the Warhawks won, 42–35 over the New Mexico State Aggies.

References

Louisiana–Monroe
Louisiana–Monroe Warhawks football seasons
Louisiana–Monroe Warhawks football